Iowa Highway 7 is a state highway that runs from east to west across the northwestern portion of Iowa.  Highway 7 is a fair sized highway in Iowa, at 74 miles (119 kilometers) long.  The western terminus of Iowa Highway 7 is at Iowa Highway 3 north of Aurelia.  The eastern terminus of Iowa 7 is at U.S. Highway 169 near Fort Dodge.

Route description
Iowa Highway 7 begins north of Aurelia at Iowa Highway 3. It goes south through Aurelia, then turns southeast to go through Alta. It continues southeast to Storm Lake, where it intersects Iowa Highway 110. Iowa 7 then turns east, passing through Newell and Fonda, before turning south again at an intersection with Iowa Highway 4. Iowa 7 and Iowa 4 go south through Pomeroy, before Iowa 7 turns east again. After passing through Manson, it continues east and ends at U.S. Highway 169 in northwestern Fort Dodge.

History
This is the fourth state highway to be designated Iowa Highway 7.  The first Iowa Highway 7 existed from 1919 to 1939 and was replaced by U.S. Route 32 in eastern Iowa and Iowa Highway 64 in western Iowa. The second Iowa Highway 7, a short spur from Iowa Highway 99 to Oakville existed from 1955 to 1957. The third Iowa Highway 7 existed from 1957 to 1969 when Iowa Highway 29 was redesignated.

The current Iowa Highway 7 route was designated in 1969.  The eastern end was truncated in 1990 when U.S. Highway 20 was moved to a new freeway alignment south of Fort Dodge.  Iowa Highway 7's former terminus was at U.S. 20, at what is now the corner of Kenyon Road and South 8th Street.

Major intersections

References

007